Salvador Tió y Montes de Oca (November 15, 1911 – September 17, 1989) was a Puerto Rican poet, writer, and promoter of Puerto Rican culture, best known for coining the term "Spanglish".

Early life
Salvador Tió y Montes de Oca, better known as Salvador Tió was born on November 20, 1911 in Mayagüez, Puerto Rico to Salvador Tió y Malaret and his wife Teresa Montes de Oca y Branderes. He completed studies in law at Columbia Law School in New York and at the Complutense University of Madrid.

Spanglish
In the late 1940s, Salvador coined the term espanglish, which later evolved to its current form, Spanglish. This was his response to the many Spanish-speaking people who immediately relinquished their mother tongue in order to learn English upon immigrating to non-Hispanic countries.

Later Years
Salvador later moved to San Juan, where he died on September 17, 1989. He was buried at Santa María Magdalena de Pazzis Cemetery in San Juan, Puerto Rico.

References

Burials at Santa María Magdalena de Pazzis Cemetery
Complutense University of Madrid alumni
Columbia Law School alumni
Puerto Rican poets
Puerto Rican male writers
1989 deaths
1911 births
20th-century American poets
People from Mayagüez, Puerto Rico
20th-century American male writers